The viceregal consort of New South Wales is the spouse of the serving governor of New South Wales, assisting the viceroy with ceremonial and charitable work, accompanying him or her to official state occasions, and occasionally undertaking philanthropic work of their own. This individual is addressed as His or Her Excellency while their spouse is in office, and is often made ex officio a Knight or Dame of Justice of the Most Venerable Order of the Hospital of Saint John of Jerusalem.

List of viceregal consorts of the governor of New South Wales

See also
 Spouse of the governor-general of Australia

References

External links
 Governor of New South Wales official website

Governors of New South Wales
Lists of people from New South Wales
Governor of New South Wales